These are tables of congressional delegations from Massachusetts to the United States House of Representatives and the United States Senate.

Current delegation 
Massachusetts is currently represented by two senators and nine representatives, all of whom are Democrats. 
The current dean of the Massachusetts delegation is Senator Ed Markey, having served in Congress since 1976.

United States Senate

United States House of Representatives

1789 to 1793: 8 seats 
Article I of the United States Constitution allocated 8 seats to Massachusetts.

1793 to 1803: 14 seats 
After the 1790 census, Massachusetts gained six seats.

In the third Congress only, there were plural districts in which more than one member would be elected from the same district and there was also an at-large seat. After that Congress, however, there would be no at-large seats and no plural seats.

1803 to 1813: 17 seats 
After the 1800 census, Massachusetts gained three seats.

1813 to 1823: 20 seats, then 13 
After the 1810 census, Massachusetts gained three seats to grow to its largest apportionment (so far). In 1820/21, however, seven of those seats were lost to the new state of Maine.

1823–1833: 13 seats 
Following the 1820 census, Massachusetts kept its remaining 13 seats without change.

1833 to 1843: 12 seats 
After the 1830 census, Massachusetts lost one seat.

1843 to 1853: 10 seats 
After the 1840 census, Massachusetts lost two seats.

1853 to 1863: 11 seats 
After the 1850 census, Massachusetts gained one seat.

1863 to 1873: 10 seats 
After the 1860 census, Massachusetts lost one seat.

1873 to 1883: 11 seats 
After the 1870 census, Massachusetts gained one seat.

1883 to 1893: 12 seats 
After the 1880 census, Massachusetts gained one seat.

1893 to 1903: 13 seats 
After the 1890 census, Massachusetts gained one seat.

1903 to 1913: 14 seats 
After the 1900 census, Massachusetts gained one seat.

1913 to 1933: 16 seats 
After the 1910 census, Massachusetts gained two seats. There was no reapportionment after the 1920 census.

1933 to 1963: 15, then 14 seats 
After the 1930 census, Massachusetts lost one seat. After the 1940 census, Massachusetts lost another seat. Massachusetts kept its apportionment following the 1950 census.

1963 to 1983: 12 seats 
After the 1960 census, Massachusetts lost two seats. Massachusetts kept its apportionment after the 1970 census.

1983 to 1993: 11 seats 
After the 1980 census, Massachusetts lost one seat.

1993 to 2013: 10 seats 
After the 1990 census, Massachusetts lost one seat. Massachusetts kept its apportionment after the 2000 census.

2013 to present: 9 seats 
After the 2010 census, Massachusetts lost one seat. Massachusetts kept its apportionment after the 2020 census.

Key

See also 

List of United States congressional districts
Massachusetts's congressional districts
Political party strength in Massachusetts

References 

Politics of Massachusetts
Massachusetts
 
 
Congressional delegations